Wesley Joel Vázquez Vázquez (born 27 March 1994) is a Puerto Rican middle distance runner.

Career
He reached the finals in the 800 metres at the 2012 World Junior Championships in Athletics in Barcelona.

On July 7, 2014, Vázquez won the Meeting International de Montreuil with a time of 1:45.65.

Personal bests

Outdoor
400 m: 46.72 sec –  Šamorín, 11 September 2020
600 m: 1:14.85 min - Caguas, 1 Aug 2020
800 m: 1:43.83 min –  Paris, 24 August 2019
1500 m: 3:46.98 min –  Mayagüez, 16 April 2016

Achievements

References

External links

Sports reference biography
Tilastopaja biography

1994 births
Living people
Sportspeople from Bayamón, Puerto Rico
Puerto Rican male middle-distance runners
Olympic track and field athletes of Puerto Rico
Athletes (track and field) at the 2012 Summer Olympics
Athletes (track and field) at the 2016 Summer Olympics
Central American and Caribbean Games bronze medalists for Puerto Rico
Competitors at the 2014 Central American and Caribbean Games
Competitors at the 2018 Central American and Caribbean Games
Athletes (track and field) at the 2019 Pan American Games
Pan American Games silver medalists for Puerto Rico
Pan American Games medalists in athletics (track and field)
Central American and Caribbean Games medalists in athletics
Competitors at the 2013 Summer Universiade
Medalists at the 2019 Pan American Games
Athletes (track and field) at the 2020 Summer Olympics